Asyanovo (Äsän) is a rural locality (a selo) and the administrative centre of Asyanovsky Selsoviet, Dyurtyulinsky District, Bashkortostan, Russia. The population was 1,479 as of 2010. There are 2 streets.

Geography 
Asyanovo is located 16 km southwest of Dyurtyuli (the district's administrative centre) by road. Verkhnekargino is the nearest rural locality.

References 

Rural localities in Dyurtyulinsky District